The Baraba steppe or Baraba Lowland, is a plain in western Siberia.

The Baraba Lowland is an important Russian agricultural region.

Geography
Grassland steppe landscapes predominate, as well as sphagnum bogs and Solonchak grounds, although there are remnants of wooded areas. Barabinsk is the largest city in the lowland. 

Lakes Chany, Ubinskoye, Sartlan and Tandovo, are located in the Baraba steppe. The Kulunda Plain extends to the southeast. The border between both areas is not well defined.

See also 
 Kurumbel Steppe
 Baraba Tatars

References

Temperate grasslands, savannas, and shrublands
Grasslands of Russia
Natural history of Siberia
Landforms of Novosibirsk Oblast
Landforms of Omsk Oblast
West Siberian Plain